Rheola may refer to:

 Rheola House, Resolven, Wales, United Kingdom
 Rheola, Wales, United Kingdom
 Rheola, Victoria, Australia